Iris Hanika (born 1962) is a German writer. She was born in Würzburg, grew up in Bad Königshofen and has lived in Berlin since 1979, where she studied Universal and Comparative Literature at the FU Berlin. She was a regular contributor to German periodicals like Frankfurter Allgemeine Zeitung (freelancer of the Berliner Seiten) and Merkur (2000–2008: column Chronicles). Hanika won the LiteraTour Nord prize and the EU Prize for Literature for her novel Das Eigentliche (The Bottom Line). In 2020, she was awarded the Hermann-Hesse-Literaturpreis for her novel Echos Kammern. In 2021, she won the Leipzig Book Fair Prize. Hanika wrote previously mainly short non-fictional texts, later novels, including two books on psychoanalysis.

Awards 
 2006 Hans Fallada Prize
 2010 European Union Prize for Literature for Das Eigentliche
 2011  for Das Eigentliche
 2017/2018 Villa Massimo
 2020 Hermann-Hesse-Literaturpreis for Echos Kammern
 2021 Leipzig Book Fair Prize for Echos Kammern

Works

References

Further reading

External links

 

1962 births
German women writers
Living people